The Subcommittee on Coast Guard and Maritime Transportation is a subcommittee within the House Transportation and Infrastructure Committee.

Jurisdiction
The Subcommittee has jurisdiction over maritime safety, security, law enforcement, and defense. Additionally, the Subcommittee exercises jurisdiction over merchant marine matters such as ocean shipping and cruise ships. The jurisdiction of this Subcommittee does not extend to matters directly related to national defense, which are handled by the House Armed Services Committee.

Members, 117th Congress

Historical membership rosters

115th Congress

116th Congress

External links
Subcommittee website

References

Transportation Coast Guard
United States Merchant Marine
United States Coast Guard
Maritime safety
United States admiralty law